Caucasaphaenops malchanovi is a species of beetle in the family Carabidae, the only species in the genus Caucasaphaenops.

References

Trechinae